Canciones de Amor may refer to:

 Canciones de Amor (Alejandra Guzmán album), 2006
 Canciones de Amor (Ricardo Arjona album), 2012
 Canciones de Amor (Yolandita Monge album), 2007